Luis Adolfo Siles Salinas (21 June 1925 – 19 October 2005) was a Bolivian politician who served as the 49th president of Bolivia in 1969 and as the 31st vice president of Bolivia from 1966 to 1969.

Background and early life

Born in La Paz, Luis Adolfo Siles was the son of former president Hernando Siles Reyes (1926–1930) and half-brother of another famous Bolivian politician and two-time president, Hernán Siles Zuazo (1956–1960 and 1982–1985). Educated as a lawyer in his native country, he also obtained a doctorate in Spain. Siles eventually joined the small Partido Demócrata Cristiano (Christian-Democrat Party), which supported René Barrientos in the 1966 elections. Eisenhower Fellowships selected Luis Adolfo Siles in 1955 to represent Bolivia.

Vice President of Bolivia

In fact, Siles ran as General Barrientos' vice-presidential running mate, and was sworn-in in that capacity after their ticket prevailed at the polls.

President of Bolivia

Siles became president when Barrientos was killed in a helicopter crash near Arque, Cochabamba, on 27 April 1969.

The Siles presidency was short and marred by disagreements with the powerful Commander of the Armed Forces, General Alfredo Ovando. The latter harbored ambitions to become president in 1970, when he was projected to run as Barrientos' successor. But Ovando's disagreements with Barrientos on a number of important issues during the 1967–69 period had displeased many die-hard Barrientos followers, including Vice-president Siles. For these reasons, in addition to resentment over the constant meddling by Ovando, Siles seemed to be throwing his support behind the surprise candidacy of the Mayor of La Paz, Armando Escobar Uría, as the true heir and successor to Barrientos (Bolivian laws did not allow direct re-election of a sitting president). This threatened to spoil General Ovando's carefully laid plans.

Overthrown by a coup d'état

In the end General Ovando decided not to wait for the elections and instead launched a coup d'état on 26 September 1969, overthrowing Siles and with him, what was left of Bolivian democracy (or its appearances, in any case).

Later years

Returning to Bolivia during the dictatorship of Hugo Banzer (1971–78), Siles played a prominent role as a defender of human rights. He ran for president in 1980, but failed to garner much support. Despite leading a relatively small party, Siles vociferously opposed the 1980-81 dictatorship of Luis García Meza.

Death

Respected for his steadfast stance in defense of democratic principles, Siles died on 19 October 2005 in La Paz.

References

1925 births
2005 deaths
20th-century Bolivian politicians
Candidates in the 1980 Bolivian presidential election
Children of national leaders
Grand Cross of the Order of Civil Merit
Grand Crosses of the Order of the Sun of Peru
Knights Grand Cross of the Order of Isabella the Catholic
Leaders ousted by a coup
People from La Paz
Presidents of Bolivia
Siles family
University of Saint Francis Xavier alumni
Vice presidents of Bolivia